Kaala-Gomen  is a commune in the North Province of New Caledonia, an overseas territory of France in the Pacific Ocean. It is situated on RT1 and is approximately 18 km south of Koumac, 50 km north of Voh, and 365 km from Nouméa.

The name of the city comes from that of a mountain and from the Gomen tribe. The city was founded on its present site in 1899, with a committee appointed by the municipal government, which became an elected municipal council in 1961 and a fully-fledged commune in 1969.

Kaala-Gomen is also home to the village of Ouaco, known for its beef cannery of the same name and the nickel mines operated by the Mining Society of the South Pacific. The village can be visited on annual heritage days.

It is located on the territory of the former mining village of Tiebaghi, which was the largest chromium mine in the world from 1902 to 1964.

The commune is part of the customary area of Hoot ma Waap.

Geography 
The highest point in the commune is Ouazangou-Taom (1092 m).

Kaala-Gomen has a port, a lighthouse on the islet of Devered, an aerodrome, a television relay station in Wala and a racecourse in Ouaco.

The neighboring communes are:

 On the west coast: Koumac, Voh
 On the east coast: Ouégoa, Hienghene

Toponymy 
The Kanak name for the commune is Bwapanu, but Gömé is also occasionally used.

Administrations

Population

References 

Communes of New Caledonia